Otherness is the second studio album by English musician Adam Bainbridge, under their solo project Kindness. It was released on October 13, 2014 through Mom + Pop Music and Female Energy.

Critical reception 
Otherness was met with generally favourable reviews from critics. At Metacritic, which assigns a weighted average rating out of 100 to reviews from mainstream publications, this release received an average score of 68, based on 18 reviews.

Accolades

Track listing

Charts

References 

2014 albums
Mom + Pop Music albums